Mikiah Janee Brisco (born July 14, 1996) is an American female track and field sprinter. She holds personal records of 10.96 seconds for the 100-meter dash and 22.59 seconds for the 200-meter dash. She also previously competed in the 100-meter hurdles, having a best of 12.85 seconds. She was a gold medallist at the 2019 IAAF World Relays and was the 60-meter dash national champion in 2020.

She is a multiple American collegiate national champion, taking the individual 100 m title in 2017 and the 4 × 100-meter relay title with the LSU Tigers track and field team in 2016 and 2018. In her youth she was the 100 m hurdles bronze medallist at the 2013 World Youth Championships in Athletics and won hurdles and relay gold medals at the 2015 Pan American Junior Athletics Championships.

Brisco won a silver medal at the 2022 World Athletics Indoor Championships – Women's 60 metres in Belgrade, Serbia.

National titles
USA Indoor Track and Field Championships
60 m: 2020, 2022
NCAA Division I Women's Outdoor Track and Field Championships
100 m: 2017
4 × 100 m relay: 2016, 2018

Personal bests
Outdoor
100 m: 10.96 (2017)
200 m:  	22.59 (2018)
100 m hurdles: 12.85 (2017)

Indoor
60 m: 6.99 (2022)
200 m: 22.81 (2018)
60 m hurdles: 7.98 (2017)
Long jump: 5.41 m (2014)

References

External links

World Athletics
LSU Bio

Living people
1996 births
Track and field athletes from Louisiana
American female sprinters
American female hurdlers
African-American female track and field athletes
LSU Tigers track and field athletes
USA Indoor Track and Field Championships winners
21st-century African-American sportspeople
21st-century African-American women
World Athletics Indoor Championships medalists